Lakshmi Vijayam may refer to:
 Lakshmi Vijayam (1976 film), an Indian Malayalam-language film
 Lakshmi Vijayam (1948 film), an Indian Tamil-language film